The 2019–20 San Jose State Spartans men's basketball team represented San Jose State University in the 2019–20 NCAA Division I men's basketball season. Led by third-year head coach Jean Prioleau, they played their home games at the newly-renamed Provident Credit Union Event Center in San Jose, California as members of the Mountain West Conference. They finished the season 7–24, 3–15 in Mountain West play to finish in tenth place. They lost in the first round of the Mountain West tournament to New Mexico.

Previous season 
The Spartans finished the season 4–27, 1–17 in Mountain West play to finish in last place. They lost in the first round of the Mountain West tournament to Air Force.

Off-season

Departures

Incoming transfers

2019 recruiting class

2020 recruiting class

Roster

Schedule and Results
Source

|-
!colspan=9 style=| Regular season

|-

|-
!colspan=9 style=| Mountain West tournament

References

San Jose State Spartans men's basketball seasons
San Jose State